The Brico Cross Trophy 2017–18 is a season long cyclo-cross competition in Belgium.

Calendar

Men's competition

Women's competition

References

2017 in cyclo-cross
2018 in cyclo-cross